Seamus Dunne (13 April 1930 – 28 September 2016) was an Irish professional footballer from Wicklow, best known as a player for English side Luton Town.

Playing career
  
Dunne joined Luton Town from Shelbourne in July 1950 and made his debut for Luton on 26 December 1951 in a 6–1 victory over West Ham United at Kenilworth Road. During the next ten years he was a regular at right back for Luton as they won promotion to Division One in 1955 and reached the 1959 FA Cup Final.

Dunne made his debut for Ireland against France in 1953, and also played against Austria during the same year. The 1960–61 season was Dunne's last at Luton; he was transferred to Yiewsley, where he played for three years. He was then player-manager at Dunstable Town while working at the Vauxhall Motors plant in Luton.

After leaving Dunstable in 1970, Dunne returned to his native Ireland. In later life he lived in retirement in Bray. He died at the age of 86 on 28 September 2016.

References

1930 births
2016 deaths
Association footballers from County Wicklow
Luton Town F.C. players
Republic of Ireland association footballers
Drogheda United F.C. players
Shelbourne F.C. players
League of Ireland players
Republic of Ireland international footballers
Hillingdon Borough F.C. players
Dunstable Town F.C. players
English Football League players
Ireland (FAI) international footballers
Republic of Ireland football managers
Dunstable Town F.C. managers
Association football defenders